The Church of Saint Bernard is a Roman Catholic parish in the North End neighborhood of Saint Paul, Minnesota. The brick church was designed by John Jager and built 1905–1914 in the Prairie School and Art Nouveau styles. It is listed on the National Register of Historic Places.

The parish formerly included a private school, Saint Bernard's High School, which closed in 2010 due to declining enrollment.

References

External links

 Church of Saint Bernard

Roman Catholic churches in Saint Paul, Minnesota
National Register of Historic Places in Saint Paul, Minnesota
Churches on the National Register of Historic Places in Minnesota
Roman Catholic churches completed in 1914
Art Nouveau architecture in Minnesota
Saint Bernard
Prairie School architecture in Minnesota
20th-century Roman Catholic church buildings in the United States